Shari Lapena (born 1960) is a Canadian novelist. She is best known for her 2016 thriller novel The Couple Next Door, which was a bestseller both in Canada and internationally.

Lapena, a lawyer and English teacher before beginning her writing career, published her debut novel Things Go Flying in 2008. That novel was a shortlisted Sunburst Award finalist in 2009. Her second novel, Happiness Economics, was a shortlisted Stephen Leacock Award finalist in 2012.

Her fourth novel, A Stranger in the House, was published in 2017.

Works
Things Go Flying (2008)
Happiness Economics (2011)
The Couple Next Door (2016)
A Stranger in the House (2017)
An Unwanted Guest (2018)
Someone We Know (2019)
 The End of Her (2020)
Not a Happy Family (2021)

References

External links

https://www.authorsbooksinorder.com/shari-lapena-books-in-order

21st-century Canadian novelists
Canadian women novelists
Writers from Toronto
Living people
Canadian thriller writers
21st-century Canadian women writers
1960 births